Joseph Mitsuaki Takami (born 21 March 1946) is a Japanese prelate of the Catholic Church who served as archbishop of Nagasaki from 2003 to 2021.

Biography
Takami was born in Nagasaki on 21 March 1946. One of his grandmothers, two aunts, and an uncle died when an atomic bomb was dropped on the city in 1945.   He was ordained a priest on 20 March 1972 and joined the Sulpicians on 29 October 1973.

From 1973 to 1985 he continued his studies in Rome. He obtained a licentiate in dogmatic theology at the Pontifical Gregorian University and another in sacred scripture at the Pontifical Biblical Institute. He also studied in Paris and Jerusalem. From 1985 to 2002 he taught dogmatic theology and sacred scripture at the Seminary of Saint Sulpitius in Fukuoka, serving as Vice-Rector (1990-1991) and Rector (1993-1998).

On 7 February 2002, Pope John Paul II appointed him auxiliary bishop of Nagasaki. He received his episcopal consecration on 29 April 2002.

He was named archbishop of Nagasaki on 17 October 2003 and served until Pope Francis accepted his resignation on 28 December 2021.

In 2015, following the first archdiocesan synod, he said the archdiocese was experiencing "a deep sense of crisis" with the "withering and enervation" of the Catholic community that had fallen from 75,000 to 62,000 in 30 years.

He has been president of the Catholic Bishops’ Conference of Japan since June 2016.

Problem in Diocesan Fund
A priest in the Catholic Archdiocese of Nagasaki who is alleged to have misappropriated a total of 250 million yen in diocesan funds without permission, the archdiocese acknowledged the misappropriation and explained the circumstances in its bulletin "Catholic Kyoho" published on September 1, 2020 and the Archbishop stated, "It is all my responsibility and I sincerely apologize."

References

External links

1946 births
Living people
21st-century Roman Catholic archbishops in Japan
People from Nagasaki Prefecture
Sulpician bishops
Japanese Roman Catholic archbishops
Pontifical Gregorian University alumni